The 1990–91 Phoenix Suns season was the 23rd season for the Phoenix Suns in the National Basketball Association. For the season opener, the Suns traveled to Japan to play their first two games against the Utah Jazz at the Tokyo Metropolitan Gymnasium, making history by being the two first teams in U.S. professional sports to play a regular season game outside of North America. The Suns got off to an 8–7 start early into the season as they traded sixth man Eddie Johnson to the Seattle SuperSonics in exchange for Xavier McDaniel. The Suns would post a 7-game winning streak as they won 17 of their next 21 games, holding a 30–16 record at the All-Star break, and ending the season finishing third in the Pacific Division with a 55–27 record.

Kevin Johnson and Tom Chambers were both selected for the 1991 NBA All-Star Game. Johnson led the Suns with 22.2 points, 10.1 assists and 2.1 steals per game, and was named to the All-NBA Second Team, while Chambers averaged 19.9 points and 6.4 rebounds per game. In addition, Jeff Hornacek provided the team with 16.9 points, 5.1 assists and 1.4 steals per game, while McDaniel averaged 15.8 points and 7.2 rebounds per game with the Suns after the trade, sixth man Dan Majerle contributed 13.6 points and 5.4 rebounds per game, while being named to the NBA All-Defensive Second Team, and Mark West and Andrew Lang both led the team with 2.0 blocks per game each.

In the Western Conference First Round of the playoffs, the Suns faced the Jazz again, and lost in four games to the 5th-seeded team. Following the season, McDaniel was traded to the New York Knicks.

Draft picks

First round pick Jayson Williams did not reach an agreement with team president Jerry Colangelo over his rookie contract, and after months of discussion Phoenix sent him to the Philadelphia 76ers in exchange for a conditional first round selection in the 1994 NBA draft. Rights to Miloš Babić were traded to the Cleveland Cavaliers for the rights of Stefano Rusconi.

Roster

Pre-season

Regular season

Season standings

y – clinched division title
x – clinched playoff spot

z – clinched division title
y – clinched division title
x – clinched playoff spot

Record vs. opponents

Game log

Playoffs

Game log

|- align="center" bgcolor="#ffcccc"
| 1
| April 25
| Utah
| L 90–129
| Negele Knight (18)
| Jeff Hornacek (5)
| Kevin Johnson (6)
| Arizona Veterans Memorial Coliseum14,487
| 0–1
|- align="center" bgcolor="#ccffcc"
| 2
| April 27
| Utah
| W 102–92
| Jeff Hornacek (25)
| Andrew Lang (8)
| Kevin Johnson (12)
| Arizona Veterans Memorial Coliseum14,487
| 1–1
|- align="center" bgcolor="#ffcccc"
| 3
| April 30
| @ Utah
| L 98–107
| Tom Chambers (26)
| Jeff Hornacek (10)
| Kevin Johnson (10)
| Salt Palace12,616
| 1–2
|- align="center" bgcolor="#ffcccc"
| 4
| May 2
| @ Utah
| L 93–101
| Jeff Hornacek (30)
| Tom Chambers (7)
| Kevin Johnson (11)
| Salt Palace12,616
| 1–3
|-

Awards and records

All-Star Game
 Tom Chambers and Kevin Johnson were selected to play in the 1991 NBA All-Star Game, their fourth and second appearances respectively.

Awards
 Kevin Johnson was selected to the All-NBA Second Team, and finished seventh in Most Valuable Player voting.
 Dan Majerle was selected to the NBA All-Defensive Second Team, and finished second in Sixth Man of the Year voting.

Records
 In a game against the Denver Nuggets on November 10, 1990, the Suns broke the NBA scoring record for a team in a half, by finishing the first two quarters ahead 107–67.
 In Game 1 of the Western Conference First Round against the Utah Jazz, Phoenix suffered their worst playoff loss in franchise history up to that point, by losing 129–90.

Injuries/Missed games
 10/30/90: Ricky Blanton: Viral infection; placed on injured list until waived on November 14
 10/30/90: Negele Knight: Pulled hamstring; placed on injured list until November 21
 10/30/90: Andrew Lang: Leg stress fracture; placed on injured list until November 16
 11/03/90: Jeff Hornacek: Sore neck; did not play
 11/07/90: Jeff Hornacek: Sore neck; did not play
 11/16/90: Ian Lockhart: Knee, ankle injuries: placed on injured list for rest of season
 11/21/90: Tim Perry: Sprained ankle; placed on injured list until December 5
 12/05/90: Andrew Lang: Bruised arm; placed on injured list until December 26
 12/26/90: Kenny Battle: Sprained ankle; placed on injured list until waived on January 23
 01/02/91: Tom Chambers: Pulled hamstring; did not play
 01/04/91: Tom Chambers: Pulled hamstring; did not play
 01/05/91: Tom Chambers: Pulled hamstring; did not play
 01/27/91: Joe Barry Carroll: Placed on suspended list until February 19
 01/27/91: Kurt Rambis: Sprained ankle; placed on injured list until February 5
 02/19/91: Tim Perry: Knee tendinitis; placed on injured list until March 17
 03/17/91: Joe Barry Carroll: Sore hamstring; placed on injured list until April 21
 04/05/91: Kevin Johnson: Strained hamstring; did not play
 04/05/91: Dan Majerle: Injured hip; did not play
 04/07/91: Kevin Johnson: Strained hamstring; did not play
 04/07/91: Dan Majerle: Injured hip: did not play
 04/09/91: Tom Chambers: Back spasms; did not play
 04/09/91: Kevin Johnson: Strained hamstring; did not play
 04/09/91: Dan Majerle: Spinal nerve irritation; did not play
 04/12/91: Tom Chambers: Back spasms; did not play
 04/12/91: Kevin Johnson: Strained hamstring; did not play
 04/12/91: Dan Majerle: Spinal nerve irritation; did not play
 04/14/91: Tom Chambers: Back spasms; did not play
 04/14/91: Kevin Johnson: Strained hamstring; did not play
 04/14/91: Dan Majerle: Spinal nerve irritation; did not play
 04/21/91: Tim Perry: Knee tendinitis; placed on injured list for rest of season

Player statistics

Season

* – Stats with the Suns.
+ – Minimum 50 games played.
^ – Minimum 125 free throws made.

Playoffs

Transactions

Trades

See also
 1990–91 NBA season

References

Phoenix Suns seasons